The year 1608 in science and technology involved some significant events.

Technology
 October 2 – Hans Lippershey demonstrates the first known telescope to the government of the Dutch Republic.
 The flintlock muzzleloader is invented; unlike most weapon systems which only lasted a few decades, the flintlock has a long-term impact.
 The manufacture of alum is invented and successfully practised in England, under the patronage of King James, by Lord Sheffield.

Zoology
 Edward Topsell's bestiary The Historie of Serpents is published in London by William Jaggard.

Births
 January 28 – Giovanni Alfonso Borelli, Italian scientist (died 1679)
 August 4 – John Tradescant the younger, English botanist (died 1662)
 October 15 – Evangelista Torricelli, Italian physicist and mathematician (died 1647)

Deaths
 December – Oswald Croll, German chemist and physician (born c1560)

References

 
17th century in science
1600s in science